Zhou Bichang (born 26 July 1985 in Changsha, Hunan), also known as Bibi Zhou, is a Chinese singer, songwriter, and actress. She debuted her singing career by winning the second place at the Chinese singing contest Super Girl in 2005. The next year she released her debut album Who Touched My Violin String. She debuted her acting career by featuring in the 2006 Chinese films McDull, the Alumni and The 601st Phone Call. In 2014, she won an MTV Europe Music Award for Best Worldwide Act. In 2015, she won a Nickelodeon Kids' Choice Award for Favorite Chinese Act.

Life and career

1985–2005: Early years and career beginnings
Zhou was born to parents Zhou Zhongzhan and Lu Yuanyuan in Changsha, Hunan, China on 26 July 1985. Her father was a government agent, while her mother was a Chinese folk music teacher. At the age of six, she and her family moved to Shenzhen, Guangdong, China. She attended Yuanling Elementary School, Gangxia Elementary School, Fuhua Elementary School, and Futian High School. In 2002, she majored in non-classical music at Xinghai Conservatory of Music in Guangzhou, Guangdong, China. In the same year, she released a song titled "How I Miss You" on the internet. In 2005, she took part in the Chinese singing contest Super Girl, and eventually won the second place at the contest.

2006–2007: Who Touched My Violin String
In March 2006, Zhou signed a recording deal with Chinese record label Yuelin Music. In the same time, she released her first studio single titled "Swan", which was included in her first extended play titled Bibi released in June 2006. The extended play followed by her debut studio album titled Who Touched My Violin String released in August 2006. In the same year, she featured in two Chinese films, McDull, the Alumni and The 601st Phone Call. In March 2007, she attend the Encore Program at Musicians Institute in Los Angeles, California, United States to take singing classes.

2007–2008: Now and Wow 
After she finished her courses at Musicians Institute, Zhou returned to China and prepared for her next studio album. In the same year, she also graduated from Xinghai Conservatory of Music with a bachelor's degree. In December 2007, she released two studio albums Now and Wow at the same time. In April 2008, she featured the theme song "Beijing Welcomes You" for the 100-day countdown of the 2008 Summer Olympics. In the same month, she joined the public benefit campaign 56 Ethnic Groups, One Dream as a young ambassador along with Hong Kong singer and professional swimmer Alex Fong.

2009–2012: Time, I, Fish, Light, Mirror, and Black Apple 
In January 2009, Zhou signed a recording deal with Gold Typhoon. In July 2009, she released her fourth studio album Time. The album was released in mainland China as well as Taiwan. In June 2010, she released her fifth studio album I, Fish, Light, Mirror. The album topped the album sales chart for one week in Taiwan. In May 2011, she launched a fashion brand Begins with Lin Zijun and Cheng Yang. In November 2011, she released her sixth studio album Black Apple.

2013: Unlock 
In October 2012, Zhou signed a recording deal with Yuehua Entertainment, and opened her own studio at the same time. In May 2013, she released her seventh studio album Unlock. She also embarked a concert tour titled Unlock Tour. In early 2014, she appeared on the Chinese singing competition I Am a Singer (season 2). In November 2014, she won an MTV Europe Music Award for Best Worldwide Act. That same year, she was internally selected by CCTV to represent China in the ABU TV Song Festival 2014, with the song "I miss you missing me". In January 2015, she held a public benefit concert Begins to Love Concert. In March 2015, she won a Nickelodeon Kids' Choice Award for Favorite Chinese Act. That year, she released the album "Rolling my eyes", which was published initially in two EP's and later released as a whole.

2015–present: Rolling My Eyes, Not Typical, Renamed, Lunar 
2018: Vocal judge on The Next Top Bang with other celebrities like Victoria Song and Kris Wu. 
2021: Zhou participates on "Sisters Who Make Waves" season 2.

Discography

Studio albums 

 Who Touched My Violin String (2006)
 Now (2007)
 Wow (2007)
 Time (2009)
 I, Fish, Light, Mirror (2010)
 Black • Choose • White (2011)
 Unlock (2013)
 Rolling My Eyes (2015) – album released as 3-part EP
 Not Typical (2017)
 Lunar (2019)

Extended plays 
 Bibi (2006)
 Slime (2020)
 Dating Oneself (一个人的约会)  (2023)

Compilation albums 

 The Best Of Bibi Chou 2009–2013 (2013)

Remix albums 

 Renamed (Remix Album) (2018)

Filmography 
 McDull, the Alumni (2006)
 The 601st Phone Call (2006)
 V Love (2014)
 Cold War 2 (2016)

Awards

References

External links 

 
 

1985 births
Living people
Xinghai Conservatory of Music alumni
Chinese women singer-songwriters
Mandopop singer-songwriters
Musicians from Changsha
Musicians Institute alumni
Singers from Hunan
Super Girl contestants